Gorley may refer to:

Places in Hampshire, England
North Gorley, a hamlet in the New Forest National Park
South Gorley, a hamlet in the New Forest National Park
Gorley Hill, the site of a former Iron Age promontory hillfort
Gorley Lynch, a hamlet in the civil parish of Gorley in the New Forest National Park

People with the surname
Ashley Gorley (born 1977), American songwriter, publisher, and producer from Danville, Kentucky
Les Gorley (born 1950), English former professional rugby league footballer
Peter Gorley (born 1951), English former professional rugby league footballer
Roger Gorley, forcibly removed from his hospitalized same-sex partner at the Research Medical Center, Kansas City, Missouri
Gorley Putt (1913–1995), British academic, author and Liberal Party candidate

See also

Gorle (disambiguation)
Gormley, a surname
Gorsley, a village in Gloucestershire, England
Gourley (disambiguation)